Lidster is an occupational surname of British origin, which means a dyer, from the Middle English litster "to dye". The name may refer to:

Doug Lidster (born 1960), Canadian ice hockey player
George Lidster (born 1962), American soccer coach
John Ronald Lidster (1916–2008), British archaeologist
Joseph Lidster (born 1977), British writer

Lidster may also refer to Illinois v. Lidster, a US Supreme Court decision.

References

Surnames of British Isles origin